W.A.K.O. European Championships 1982 were the sixth European kickboxing championships hosted by the W.A.K.O. organization organized by Jean-Pierre Schupp and heralded the beginning of W.A.K.O. having its European championships every two years as opposed to once a year.  The event was open to amateur men based in Europe and featured only one style of kickboxing - Semi-Contact.  By the end of the championships, Italy was the top nation, with regular leaders West Germany beaten into second and Great Britain third.  The event was held in Basel, Switzerland in 1981.

Men's Semi-Contact Kickboxing

Semi-Contact kickboxing involved the winning of matches via the scoring of points based on skill, speed and technique, with excessive force outlawed - more information on Semi-Contact can be found on the W.A.K.O. website, although the rules will have changed since 1982.  There were seven weight divisions in Semi-Contact ranging from 57 kg/125.4 lbs to over 84 kg/+184.8 lbs.  By the end of the championships the top nation in Semi-Contact was Italy with a total of three golds, one silver and one bronze.

Men's Semi-Contact Kickboxing Medals Table

Overall Medals Standing (Top 5)

See also
List of WAKO Amateur European Championships
List of WAKO Amateur World Championships

References

External links
 WAKO World Association of Kickboxing Organizations Official Site

WAKO Amateur European Championships events
Kickboxing in Switzerland
1982 in kickboxing
Sport in Basel